Marwell Periotti (25 May 1939 – 27 October 2004) was an Argentine footballer who competed in the 1960 Summer Olympics.

References

1939 births
2004 deaths
Association football goalkeepers
Argentine footballers
Olympic footballers of Argentina
Footballers at the 1960 Summer Olympics
San Lorenzo de Almagro footballers